The Sacramento Union Ladies Classic was a golf tournament on the LPGA Tour, played only in 1974. It was played at the Cameron Park Country Club in Sacramento, California. Carole Jo Kabler won the event by four strokes over Jane Blalock and Catherine Duggan.

References

Former LPGA Tour events
Golf in California
Sports in Sacramento, California
Women's sports in California
1974 in California